Clutch Gaming (CG) was an American esports organization owned by Dignitas and the Houston Rockets. It was one of four organizations that joined the League of Legends Championship Series (LCS) after the league began franchising in 2018, the others being 100 Thieves, the Golden Guardians and OpTic Gaming.

Clutch Gaming was under the sole ownership of the Houston Rockets until June 6, 2019, when it was announced that the majority share in the franchise had been purchased by Dignitas and its parent company. Clutch Gaming completely merged with Dignitas on October 28, 2019.

History

Founding 
The Houston Rockets announced the founding of Clutch Gaming and its acquisition of a spot in the North American League of Legends Championship Series (NA LCS) on November 20, 2017. Clutch Gaming was one of four organizations to join the NA LCS after the league began franchising, the others being 100 Thieves, the Golden Guardians and OpTic Gaming.

2018 season 
For the 2018 NA LCS Spring Split, Tae-yoo "Lira" Nam, Apollo "Apollo" Price and Nickolas "Hakuho" Surgent were acquired from Team Envy's roster before they disbanded, while Colin "Solo" Earnest and Fabian "Febiven" Diepstraten were acquired from Gold Coin United and H2K respectively. Clutch Gaming finished the regular season in sixth place after losing two tiebreakers to Cloud9 and TSM, ending with 11 wins and 9 losses. This placement secured them a spot in playoffs, where they defeated TSM 3–1 in an upset victory in the quarterfinals, but lost 2–3 to 100 Thieves in the semifinals and 0–3 to Echo Fox in the third-place decider match.

Clutch Gaming ended the 2018 NA LCS Summer Split in ninth place, with a 6–12 record. The team qualified for the 2018 NA LCS Regional Qualifier after FlyQuest lost to 100 Thieves in the quarterfinals, as Clutch Gaming placed higher than FlyQuest in championship points due to the outcome of the match. Clutch Gaming lost to Echo Fox 0–3 in the first round of the regional qualifier and was eliminated from Worlds contention.

In late November 2018, Clutch Gaming and Echo Fox traded players in preparation for the upcoming 2019 LCS Spring Split (which had recently renamed to exclude "NA" from its title). Solo, Apollo and Hakuho left Clutch Gaming to join Echo Fox, and in return Clutch Gaming acquired Heo "Huni" Seung-hoon and Tanner "Damonte" Damonte. Chae "Piglet" Gwang-jin and Philippe "Vulcan" Laflamme were also moved from the organization's academy team to complete the roster.

2019 season 
Clutch Gaming ended the 2019 LCS Spring Split in ninth place once again, with a 5–13 record. Prior to the start of the 2019 LCS Summer Split, Clutch Gaming announced that it would replace Piglet with Cody Sun as the team's starting bot laner. After defeating the Golden Guardians in the last week of the summer regular season, Clutch Gaming was able to secure a spot in playoffs with a fifth-place finish and a 9–9 record. In the quarterfinals Clutch Gaming once again defeated TSM 3–1, moving on to the semifinals, where they lost 2–3 to Team Liquid in a close series. Clutch Gaming was then reverse swept by CLG in the third-place decider match, forcing them to begin in the first round of the regional qualifier for the 2019 World Championship. After defeating FlyQuest, CLG and TSM in the first, second and third rounds respectively, Clutch Gaming secured a spot in the 2019 World Championship as the LCS' third seed.

Clutch Gaming began in the play-in stage of the 2019 World Championship, where they were placed in Group A with Russian team Unicorns of Love and Australian team Mammoth. After losing to the Unicorns of Love and defeating Mammoth in both round robins, Group A was locked in a three-way tie, but Clutch Gaming avoided the first tiebreaker match due to them having the shortest total game time (63:37) among their victories. Clutch Gaming then defeated the Unicorns of Love to secure first seed in their group. In the second round of play-in stage, Clutch Gaming was pitted against Turkish team Royal Youth, who they promptly swept 3–0 to secure a spot in the main event.

Because of group draw rules for the main event, Clutch Gaming was forced into Group C, which was nicknamed the "group of death" due to it having three regional superteams: South Korea's SK Telecom T1, China's Royal Never Give Up, and Europe's Fnatic. Clutch Gaming finished the main event group stage with a 0–6 record and were eliminated without picking up a single win in the double round robin.

Acquisition by Dignitas 
It was announced on June 6, 2019, that Dignitas and its parent company had purchased the majority share in the franchise. Clutch Gaming subsequently merged with Dignitas completely on October 28, 2019.

Final rosters 

 LCS team

 Academy team

Tournament results 

 LCS team

 Academy team

References

External links 
 

2017 establishments in Texas
2019 disestablishments in Texas
Esports teams established in 2017
Esports teams based in the United States
Former North American League of Legends Championship Series teams